Jongen is a surname. Notable people with the surname include:

 Joseph Jongen (1873–1953) Belgian organist, composer, and music educator
 Léon Jongen (1884–1969), Belgian composer and organist
 Marc Jongen (born 1968), German politician

See also
 Jørgen